Sébastien Bonetti (born 22 September 1977 in Bergerac), is a French rugby union player. He has played for Biarritz Olympique.

Career
Sébastien Bonetti began playing Rugby Union with Biarritz Olympique. He moved to AS Béziers Hérault in 2006. He earned his first cap playing for the French national team on 3 March 2001 against the Italy.

External links 
 Sébastien Bonetti International Statistics

French rugby union players
France international rugby union players
People from Bergerac, Dordogne
Living people
1977 births
Sportspeople from Dordogne
Rugby union centres
Rugby union fullbacks